John Edwin Woods (August 16, 1942 – February 15, 2023) was an American translator who specialized in translating German literature, since about 1978. His work includes much of the fictional prose of Arno Schmidt and the works of contemporary authors such as Ingo Schulze and Christoph Ransmayr. He also translated all the major novels of Thomas Mann, as well as works by many other writers. Born in Indiana, Woods lived for many years in California before moving to Berlin in 2005.

Selected translations

Alfred Döblin
 A People Betrayed
 Karl and Rosa

Doris Dörrie
 Love, Pain, and the Whole Damn Thing
 What Do You Want from Me?

Friedrich Dürrenmatt
 A Monster Lecture on Justice and Law
 The Execution of Justice

Günter Grass
 Show Your Tongue

Thomas Mann
 Joseph und seine Brüder: Joseph and His Brothers
 Der Zauberberg: The Magic Mountain
 Doktor Faustus: Doctor Faustus
 Buddenbrooks: Buddenbrooks

Libuše Moníková 
 Die Fassade: The Façade

Wilhelm Raabe
 Horacker

John Rabe
 The Good Man of Nanking

Christoph Ransmayr
Die Schrecken des Eises und der Finsternis: The Terrors of Ice and Darkness
Die letzte Welt: The Last World
Morbus Kitahara: The Dog King

Arno Schmidt
 Nobodaddys Kinder: Nobodaddy's Children
 Das steinerne Herz: The Stony Heart
 Die Gelehrtenrepulik: The Egghead Republic
 Kaff auch Mare Crisium: Boondocks/Moondocks
 Zettel's Traum: Bottom's Dream
 Die Schule der Atheisten: School for Atheists
 Abend mit Goldrand: Evening Edged in Gold (winner of the National Book Award and the PEN Prize for translation in 1981)

Ingo Schulze
 Simple Storys: Simple Stories
 33 Augenblicke des Glücks: 33 Moments of Happiness
 Neue Leben: New Lives
 Handy: dreizehn Geschichten in alter Manier: One More Story: Thirteen Stories in the Time-Honored Mode
 Adam und Evelyn: Adam and Evelyn

Patrick Süskind
 Perfume (winner of the PEN Prize for translation in 1987)
 The Pigeon

Hans-Ulrich Treichel 
 Leaving Sardinia

Awards
For his edition of Schmidt's Evening Edged in Gold, Woods received the 1981 U.S. National Book Award in category Translation (a split award). 
He won the PEN Prize for translation twice, for that work and again for Perfume in 1987. Woods was also awarded the Helen and Kurt Wolff Translator's Prize for his translations of Thomas Mann's The Magic Mountain and Arno Schmidt's Nobodaddy's Children in 1996; as well as the Schlegel-Tieck Prize for the translation of Christoph Ransmayr's The Last World in 1991. He was awarded the Ungar German Translation Award in 1995, and later the prestigious Goethe-Medal from the Goethe Institute in 2008.

References

External links
 

1942 births
2023 deaths
German–English translators
Writers from Berlin
Translators of Thomas Mann
National Book Award winners